Théodore Wambeke was a Belgian rower. He competed at the 1928 Summer Olympics in Amsterdam with the men's coxed four where they were eliminated in the quarter-final.

References

External links

Year of birth missing
Year of death missing
Belgian male rowers
Olympic rowers of Belgium
Rowers at the 1928 Summer Olympics
European Rowing Championships medalists
20th-century Belgian people